In Greek mythology, Mégês (Ancient Greek: Μέγης) may refer to the following figures:

 Meges, defender of Thebes against the Seven Against Thebes.
 Meges, son of Phyleus and one of the Achaean Leaders.
 Meges, father of Polymnius, a Trojan warrior.
 Meges, a wealthy Trojan and son of Dymas. He married Periboea who bore him sons: Celtus and Eubius, both participated in the Trojan War.

Notes

References 

 Apollodorus, The Library with an English Translation by Sir James George Frazer, F.B.A., F.R.S. in 2 Volumes, Cambridge, MA, Harvard University Press; London, William Heinemann Ltd. 1921. ISBN 0-674-99135-4. Online version at the Perseus Digital Library. Greek text available from the same website.
 Publius Papinius Statius, The Thebaid translated by John Henry Mozley. Loeb Classical Library Volumes. Cambridge, MA, Harvard University Press; London, William Heinemann Ltd. 1928. Online version at the Topos Text Project.
 Publius Papinius Statius, The Thebaid. Vol I-II. John Henry Mozley. London: William Heinemann; New York: G.P. Putnam's Sons. 1928. Latin text available at the Perseus Digital Library.

Trojans
Theban characters in Greek mythology
Characters in Seven against Thebes